The history of merit badges in the Boy Scouts of America (BSA) has been tracked by categorizing them into a series of merit badge types. In addition to the Boy Scouts of America, many other Scouting and Scouting-like organizations around the world, such as Pathfinders, Baden-Powell Scouts and Royal Rangers, issue merit badges or their equivalent; though they are sometimes called honors or proficiency badges. Other organizations, such as fire brigades, issue badges or awards that they refer to as merit badges, but that is in some respects different from the badges awarded by the BSA.

Merit badges have been an integral part of the Scouting program since the start of the movement in the United Kingdom on August 1, 1907, and are an important part of the uniform and insignia of Scouts, BSA. Scouting came to the United States in 1910; the BSA quickly issued an initial list of just 14 merit badges but did not produce or award them. In 1911, the BSA manufactured the first official 57 merit badges and began awarding them. The number of badges available has been as high as 127 in 1975 and again in 1987.  As of February 2017, the number of badges available is 137. Merit badge types are identifiable by the cloth and manufacturing process used to make them. The classification of badges into types came about as a way for collectors to categorize and classify their collections. Merit badge collectors often collect other Scouting memorabilia as well.

Purpose of merit badges
Merit badges exist to encourage Scouts to explore areas that interest them and to teach them valuable skills in Scoutcraft. The award of merit badges sometimes leads to careers and lifelong hobbies. Scouts earn a merit badge by satisfying specified criteria; a Court of Honor is then held to present the badge. Scouts can earn badges at any point in their Scouting career, although this was not always the case — in the 1960s, Scouts first had to earn the rank of First Class before being allowed to work on and earn badges. The higher ranks of Star, Life, and Eagle require merit badges be earned. Certain badges are mandatory to receive these higher ranks. For a few years during the 1980s and 90s, First Aid merit badge was a requirement for the First Class rank. Other mandatory badges include Citizenship in the Community and Environmental Science (see full list). The number of merit badges required for each of these higher ranks has varied historically, as has the ratio of mandatory merit badges and non-mandatory badges for those ranks. Since 2005, Scouts must earn a total of 21 merit badges for the Eagle Scout rank, 14 of which must be from the mandatory list. Once Scouts attain the Eagle rank, they can earn Eagle Palms, a core requirement of which is earning more merit badges.

Badge history

The BSA changes the design, name, and availability of merit badges depending on various factors such as their popularity, shifts in the focus of the Scouting program, and changes in society. Of the original 57 merit badges from 1911, only 11 are still available that also still have the same basic design motif (Architecture, Art, Athletics, Chemistry, First Aid, Lifesaving, Music, Plumbing, Public Health, Scholarship, and Surveying). Of those 11, only five were made available in each "generation" of the 10 merit badge types (these are Architecture, Art, Chemistry, Plumbing, and Public Health). The remaining six were not reproduced in a short-lived "generation" of merit badges, Type I.  There are another 21 merit badges still available that are essentially the same as 1911 merit badges but with different designs: American Business (was Business), Archery, Astronomy, Aviation, Bird Study (was Ornithology), Bugling, Camping, Cooking, Cycling, Electricity, Fire Safety (was Firemanship), Fishing (was Angling), Forestry, Gardening, Horsemanship, Painting, Photography, Pioneering, Sculpture, Small Boat Sailing (was Seamanship), and Swimming. 

Examples of merit badge change due to the degree of popularity/interest in a subject include "Interpreting", which only existed from 1911 to 1952, when it was dropped; and "Genealogy" which was added in 1972 when interest in that subject increased.

An example of merit badges reflecting changes in the focus of the Scouting program is "Civics", which was originally the only citizenship-related merit badge. In 1947 the name was changed to "Citizenship."  In 1952, the BSA split "Citizenship" into four separate badges, which were in turn modified several times. Since 1991, the badges in this group are "Citizenship in the Community", "Citizenship in the Nation", "Citizenship in the World", and "Family Life", all four of which are currently on the mandatory list for Eagle Scout.

The "First Aid to Animals" and "Plant Science" merit badges have both evolved due to societal changes. "First Aid to Animals" was one of the original merit badges in 1911 but was dropped in 1972. It was resurrected as "Veterinary Science" in 1973 with a focus on small pet-type animals vs. farm animals. It was renamed "Veterinary Medicine" in 1995. Merging of merit badges can be seen in "Plant Science", into which all crop growing merit badges were merged in the 1970s. Similarly, most of the merit badges related to animal husbandry were merged into "Animal Science".

The "Personal Health" merit badge was an original 1911 badge with a heart motif.  It was merged with the "Physical Development" badge and was replaced in 1952 with the "Personal Fitness" badge. It was redesigned in 1969, displaying a youth in gym gear doing what appears to be a jumping jack exercise.

The merit badges on the mandatory list for Eagle Scout have changed several times; "First Aid" is the only merit badge that has always been on the mandatory list for Eagle Scout. In 1969, the BSA began manufacturing those merit badges that are required in order to obtain the rank of Eagle Scout with a silver border instead of the green border used on other merit badges. In honor of the 100th anniversary of the BSA, a historical merit badge program was announced by BSA. Scouts could earn any of the four merit badges: Carpentry, Pathfinding, Signaling, and Tracking. Each had been previously retired in 1952, except Signaling, which was discontinued in 1992. These could be used as electives for Star Scout, Life Scout, and Eagle Scout, and had to be started and completed during 2010; after which these badges would again be retired. There have been a number of discontinued merit badges over the years.

A new merit badge for Robotics was jointly announced by NASA and the Boy Scouts of America in July 2011. This new badge recognizes the importance of STEM (science, technology, engineering, and math) and the 'wide-reaching impact of robotics'. The BSA worked for 14 months to develop this new badge, collaborating with organizations such as iRobot, Vex Robotics, the Boston Museum of Science, Carnegie Mellon Robotics Academy and NASA. The BSA currently has 31 STEM-related merit badges.

Boy Scouts who have earned all merit badges
There have been 474 confirmed Boy Scouts who have earned all the merit badges. The first Boy Scout to do so was Stephen Porter in 1914. The first Boy Scout to earn all the merit badges before earning his Eagle was David R. Schulze in 2004. Both of his younger brothers Lance Schulze and Aaron Schulze would follow in his footsteps making them one of four families where all three sons earned every merit badge. The other trios are the Kunz brothers from San Diego, the Pugh brothers from Ferndale, and the Weeks brothers from South Ogden. The first Boy Scout to earn all the merit badges and go on to travel to every sovereign country was Indy Nelson in 2011, with the latter achieved in 2017.

A record of Boy Scouts who have earned all available merit badges can be found at Merit Badge Knot.com. This record may be incomplete, but it is the best record currently available. Additionally, scouts who have earned all the merit badges may receive a square knot patch from Merit Badge Knot.com.

Types of merit badges
According to collectors and badge historians, there have been 11 major styles of merit badges: Types A, B, C, D, E, F, G, H, I, J, and K.

Type A

Type B

Type C

Type D

Type E

Type F

Type G

Type H

Type I

Type J

Type K

Historical

Errors vs variations

The visual appearance of a merit badge may alter due to several reasons. A "variation" is a minor change, whether intentional or not. A "manufacturing error" is a mistake or significant deviation from the BSA-approved badge design during production. A "design error" is when a badge is manufactured the way it was designed, but the design had a significant flaw.

Specimen variations
Variations do not appreciably alter the badge's appearance or design. Two types of variations include positional changes and stitching changes. These are often caused by manufacturing variations and are not classified separately. However, some variations have attained notoriety, such as the waffle weave variation found among Type C badges and the large people vs. slender people variations among Family Life badges. Such variations were very common up until the 1940s and still occur, though not as often. Collectors find these variations interesting and collect such badges. Examples of positional shifts among the objects comprising the motif of a merit badge include changes in the precise positioning of the tent and the mountains among Camping Type H merit badges.

Stitch patterns and thread types such as silk or cotton are not always consistent. There are three known stitching variations among the Type C Personal Health merit badges: "vertical heart", "horizontal heart", and "split heart"; the variation creates the appearance of a split down the middle of the heart. A similar error appears in both Type H and Type J Citizenship in the Nation badges, where colors vary in order from red, white, and blue to blue, white, and red; the reasons for this are unknown. Large and small bell varieties also exist. Most Type C badges come in both cotton and silk thread variations. Emergency Preparedness was made with a red cross from 1972 until 1979, when it was replaced with a green cross in 1980. This change was intentionally made.

Manufacturing errors
Genuine manufacturing errors occur from time to time. Some Atomic Energy Type G badges were made without a nucleus. The only time a merit badge was made without a silver, green, blue (aviation blues only), or gold (2010 historicals only) border was in 1987 when Whitewater Type H badges were made with a black border. Dairying appears in Type H with the cheese in both orange and burgundy. It is supposed to be orange.

There have been at least three Type H badges made with little or no plastic; called plasticizing or Type G errors: American Cultures, Colonial Philadelphia, and Journalism. The Colonial Philadelphia patch was only available from 1975 until 1976 to Scouts in the Philadelphia region and could only be used for Eagle Palms.

First Aid to Animals (FATA) Type H was made in error with a silver border in 1972. This is one of the most famous errors. It has a slight blue tint in the plastic back (see photos). It is believed that only about 100 of these were made and that only about 50 have survived to this day. Counterfeit versions of this badge error also exist. Beekeeping merit badge Type G is also known in silver border error.

Design errors
The known design errors are all from the early years. Beekeeping was made from 1914 to 1938 with only four legs instead of six simply because of human design error. Beekeeping also exists in thick and thin bodies in Type C. Insect Life was first made, from 1923 to 1924, with a spider on it. Since a spider is an arachnid, not an insect, the design was changed to an aphid the following year. As this particular merit badge specimen was only issued for one year, it is extremely rare.

Spoof merit badges
Spoof merit badges are created and sold by various third parties as a parody or joke. A multitude of emblems includes snoring, walking, surfing, computer viruses, citizenship in the universe, snow art, text messaging, whining, boat sinking, duct tape and adult beverage drinking.

Notes

Bibliography

External links
 

Advancement and recognition in the Boy Scouts of America
Collecting